"Everyone's Waiting" is the second single from Australian singer-songwriter Missy Higgins' third album, The Ol' Razzle Dazzle.  It was the most commercially successful single from the album, peaking at No. 11 on the Australian ARIA Chart and was certified platinum. Higgins performed the song at the 2012 ARIA Awards, where the single won the award for "Best Video"

Missy said; "The song deals with a real inner conflict I went through regarding music, so to personify the water as both my nemesis and then my saviour is pretty spot on when relating to the meaning of the song. I feel honoured to have worked with such an incredible film-maker."

Video
The video for "Everyone's Waiting" was filmed in Byron Bay and directed by Natasha Pincus At the ARIA Music Awards of 2012, it won ARIA Award for Best Video.

Review
Nick Bassett from Chart Shaker reviewed the song saying: "‘Everyone’s Waiting’ serves up yet another stunning vocal from the singer and the lyrics deliver what could be interpreted as a devastatingly personal summation [as to] why she chose to take that break following a well-documented struggle to express herself after two massively successful albums."

Simone Ubaldi from Beat Music reviewed the song, saying: "...it’s actually quite a lovely song. It’s affecting, it’s genuine, has a simple melody and a warm arrangement. But if you stop and think about it, the song is a very sweet exercise in self-pity, and that, from Missy Higgins, is unbearable.

Sean Holio from Cooltry said the song is "melodically charming".

Charts
"Everyone's Waiting" made its premier on the ARIA charts at No. 31, before peaking at No. 11 on 29 July 2012.

Weekly Charts

End of Year Charts

Certifications

References

2012 singles
ARIA Award-winning songs
Missy Higgins songs
2012 songs
Eleven: A Music Company singles
Songs written by Dan Wilson (musician)
Songs written by Missy Higgins